The 2006 Champion Hurdle was a horse race held at Cheltenham Racecourse on Tuesday 14 March 2006. It was the 76th running of the Champion Hurdle.

The winner was the Novice Syndicate's Brave Inca, an eight-year-old gelding trained in Ireland by Colm Murphy and ridden by A. P. McCoy. The victory was the first in the race, for the owner and trainer. McCoy had previously won the race on Make A Stand in 1997.

Brave Inca started the 7/4 favourite and won by a length from Macs Joy, with Hardy Eustace, who had won the race for the last two years in third. Fourteen of the eighteen runners completed the course.

Race details
 Sponsor: Smurfit Kappa
 Purse: £350,000; First prize: £202,683
 Going: Good to Soft
 Distance: 2 miles 110 yards
 Number of runners: 18
 Winner's time: 3m 50.00

Full result

 Abbreviations: nse = nose; nk = neck; hd = head; dist = distance; UR = unseated rider; PU = pulled up

Winner's details
Further details of the winner, Brave Inca
 Sex: Gelding
 Foaled: 20 April 1998
 Country: Ireland
 Sire: Good Thyne; Dam: Wigwam Mam (Commanche Run)
 Owner: Novices Syndicate
 Breeder: D. W. Macauley

References

Champion Hurdle
 2006
Champion Hurdle
Champion Hurdle
2000s in Gloucestershire